Lalmatia Colliery was a private, underground coal mine at Lalmatia, District- Santhal Paragana (now in Godda District a breakaway part of Santhal Paragana). After nationalisation of non-coking coal mines in India during 1973, this mine was taken over by the Indian government and came under Eastern Coalfields Limited (ECL, a subsidiary of Coal India Limited). 

Until the early 1990s, the mine produced around 100 tons of coal per day. It was located 34 km North of Godda in the Godda district, in the Indian state of Jharkhand. This suburban area was ECL's largest opencast project. Besides Rajmahal Coal Mining Project, which is the main supplier of coal to Farrakka NTPC and Kahalgaon NTPC, Lalmatia Colliery attracted businessmen, politicians, criminals, administrative officials and ECL officials. Lalmatia Collieryhas now been renamed as Rajmahal Opencast Project under Rajmhal Group of Mines of Eastern Coalfields Ltd.

Most people of Lalmatia and surrounding villages (Dakaita, Hijukita, Basdiha, Lohandia, Bhorai, Bara Simra, Neema, Kendua, Telgama, Kusuma, Tetaria, Ballia etc.) are employed with Rajmahal Coal Mining Project. Mining is done on a large scale in this area with the help of may world class companies like Birla, CISC etc. The people around this area enjoy many facilities like free electricity, free water supply and many more things. The major problem faced by the people of this area is dust and pollution which come from the nearby crusher.

Accident in mine 
Ten miners were died and unspecified number of miner trapped, when massive mound of earth came crashing down on them at Lalmatia open cast coal mine of Eastern Coalfields Ltd last night, the worst such disaster in over a decade.

Reference 

Coal mines in India
Former coal mines
Former mines in India
Mining in Jharkhand